Tom E. Brown (born March 2, 1967) is an American director, screenwriter, producer, and actor.

Career
Brown’s short film Don’t Run, Johnny was acquired by IFC after its screening at the Sundance Film Festival in 1998. IFC also acquired his next two short films, Rubber Gloves (Golden Spire winner) and Das Clown (Sundance 2000). In addition to hundreds of festival screenings, Brown’s films have been featured at the American Museum of Natural History, the Walker Art Center and The Guggenheim.

Brown’s feature debut, Pushing Dead, was a Sundance Institute/Rockefeller Foundation-supported feature starring 	
James Roday, Robin Weigert, and Danny Glover. Pushing Dead screened at over 50 film festivals, garnering awards for all three main actors and 10 best-feature audience and jury awards. Pushing Dead was released in North America in 2018.

References 

Film directors from San Francisco
American male screenwriters
Male actors from San Francisco
Film producers from California
1967 births
Living people
Place of birth missing (living people)